Theme is a 1988 album by Leslie West. It features Jack Bruce and Joe Franco. It takes its title from the track "Theme for an Imaginary Western", first recorded by Jack Bruce on Songs for a Tailor and subsequently featured on Mountain's debut album Climbing!.

Track listing
 "Talk Dirty" (Charlie Karp) 3:35
 "Motherload" (Leslie West, Joe Franco) 3:10
 "Theme for an Imaginary Western" (Jack Bruce, Pete Brown) 4:40
 "I'm Crying" (Leslie West) 3:02
 "Red House" (Jimi Hendrix) 4:58
 "Love is Forever" (Leslie West, Corky Laing) 3:51
 "I Ate It" (Leslie West) 3.00
 "Spoonful" (Willie Dixon) 7:27
 "Love Me Tender" (Elvis Presley, Vera Matson) 1:41

Personnel
Leslie West — guitar, vocals
Jack Bruce — bass, vocals 
Joe Franco — drums
Alan St. Jon – keyboards, backing vocals
Technical
Les Katz – cover
Ed McCarthy – photography

References

1988 albums
Leslie West albums
Passport Records albums